The 2010 South Australian National Football League season was the 131st season of the top-level Australian rules football competition in South Australia.

Premiership season

Ladder

Grand final

References 

 https://web.archive.org/web/20141112051034/http://australianfootball.com/seasons/season/SANFL/2010/basic
 http://www.sanfl.com.au/files/_system/File/PDFs/2011/2010_ar.pdf

South Australian National Football League seasons
SANFL